Mangang is one of the seven clans of Meetei, which is among the Yek or Salai of Hao people of Manipur. It consists of several Yumnaks which are native peoples of ancient Kangleipak (now Manipur), one of the states of India.

See also
Meitei surnames
Luwang
Khuman
Angom
Moilang
Kha Nganpa
Salai Leishangthem

References

Clans of Meitei